Bit_Meddler is the alias of experimental musician Matt Anderson. His musical compositions incorporate glitch and mashup styles.

He worked for the design agency Soft Gold U.S.A. and performed at Pukkelpop 2001 in Belgium.

A music video of his track "Cut" by Till Heim earned an honorable mention at the 2005 International Short Film Festival Oberhausen.

Discography

Singles 
 Frustum / Dermetfak (7") 	 Planet Mu 	2001
 Shitmix2000 (12")       Planet Mu 2002

Remixes 
Crunch 2 (CD) 	Bit_Meddler Mix (Toe Tac Tic) 	Colony Productions 2002
Crunch 2 (12") Toe Tac Tic (Bit_Meddler Mix)	Colony Productions 2003

References

External links 
Bit_Meddler's page on Planet Mu Records: http://www.planet-mu.com/artists/Bit_Meddler
Discogs: http://www.discogs.com/artist/Bit_Meddler

American electronic musicians
Planet Mu artists